Down in San Diego is a 1941 American adventure film directed by Robert B. Sinclair and written by Franz Schulz and Harry Clork. The black-and-white movie was filmed in San Diego and stars Bonita Granville, Ray McDonald, Dan Dailey, Leo Gorcey, Henry O'Neill and Stanley Clements. The film was released on July 30, 1941, by Metro-Goldwyn-Mayer.

Plot

Hank Parker is turned down by the U.S. Marine Corps for being too young, but his girlfriend Betty's older brother Al Haines is not. Al, however, is blackmailed by former criminal associates, framed for the murder of a man named Matt Herman if he refuses to spy for the crooks, who will sell the information to American enemies for a profit.

Al agrees and goes to San Diego to begin his military service. Hank, Betty and friends follow, trailing clues that could help clear Al's good name. They end up in the clutches of gangsters who take them hostage.

Al discloses to superior officer Col. Halliday that the criminals want him to steal a Navy boat on the Germans' behalf. Halliday has him go through with it, then attacks the Germans when they attempt to take the vessel. Al is killed in a heroic effort. He is praised by Halliday, who also feels Hank might be mature enough to enlist after all.

Cast 
Bonita Granville as Betty Haines
Ray McDonald as Hank Parker
Dan Dailey as Al Haines
Leo Gorcey as 'Snap' Collins
Henry O'Neill as Col. Halliday
Stanley Clements as Louie Schwartz
Charles Smith as Crawford Cortland
Dorothy Morris as Mildred Burnette
Rudolph Anders as Henry Schrode
Joe Sawyer as Dutch
Anthony Warde as Tony
William Tannen as Matt Herman

References

External links 
 

1941 films
American adventure films
1941 adventure films
Metro-Goldwyn-Mayer films
San Diego
Films with screenplays by Franz Schulz
Films directed by Robert B. Sinclair
American black-and-white films
Films set in San Diego
Films shot in San Diego
1940s English-language films
1940s American films